Starworld is an apparel brand owned by an international group that owns the Cotton Club, that produces apparel and is a marketer and a vertically integrated manufacturer. The company and brand's manufacturing centre is in Alexandria, Egypt, and the brand has offices in Warrington (England), Alphen aan den Rijn (Holland) and Nicosia (Cyprus).

History
The brand was first developed in the 1990s, and the Cotton Club has sole rights to produce and sell Starworld to the European apparel decoration market. The Cotton Club is a fully certified environmental and ethical factory that is certified WRAP, SMETA, OEKO-TEX 100 Standard and Reach. The factory is also GOTS certified, meaning it can produce organic clothing. This has resulted in Starworld clothing being produced under market leading certifications.

The brand uses ring spun cotton as standard along with the famous long staple Egyptian cotton.

The Starworld brand is used by the Cotton Club for marketing a broad range of apparel essentials:

 Activewear, such as performance sportswear.
 Casualwear, such as T-shirts, fleece, polo shirts and sweatshirts.

References

External links
 Official website
 Manufacturer website

Clothing brands
Clothing companies established in 1990
Egyptian brands
Clothing companies of Egypt
Companies based in Alexandria
Egyptian companies established in 1990